In British English, a haberdasher is a business or person who sells small articles for sewing, dressmaking and knitting, such as buttons, ribbons, and zippers; in the United States, the term refers instead to  a retailer who sells men's clothing, including suits, shirts, and neckties. 

The sewing articles are called haberdashery in British English. The corresponding term is notions in American English where haberdashery is the name for the shop itself, though it is largely an archaicism now. In Britain, haberdashery shops, or haberdashers, were a mainstay of high street retail until recent decades, but are now uncommon, due to the decline in home dressmaking, knitting and other textile skills and hobbies, and the rise of internet shopping.  They were very often drapers as well, the term for sellers of cloth.


Origin and use

The word haberdasher appears in Chaucer's Canterbury Tales. It is derived from the Anglo-French word . It is debatable what  meant, but most likely it was some type of fabric or assorted small ware. A haberdasher would retail small wares, the goods of the pedlar, while a mercer would specialize in "linens, silks, fustian, worsted piece-goods and bedding".

In Belgium and elsewhere in Continental Europe, Saint Nicholas remains their patron saint, while Saint Catherine was adopted by the Worshipful Company of Haberdashers in the City of London.

See also
 Hatter
 Mercery

References

External links

 01
Clothing retailers
Sales occupations
Milliners
Suit makers